
The following is a list of Playboy Playmates of 2004, the 50th anniversary year of the publication. Playboy magazine names its Playmate of the Month each month throughout the year.

January

Colleen Shannon (born April 14, 1978) is an American DJ and model who is Playboy's Playmate of the Month for January 2004. She is the magazine's 50th anniversary Playmate.

February

Aliya Wolf (born January 17, 1975, in Stephenville, Texas) is an American model and photographer who is Playboy magazine's Playmate of the Month for February 2004.

A model since she was nineteen, she is a former Miss Houston and Star Search spokesmodel. Wolf tried out for Playboy scouts for the 50th Anniversary Playmate Hunt. She appeared in its pictorial in the December 2003 issue. Wolf lives in Texas, and is married and has children. She rides Harley-Davidsons and maintains horses.

March

Sandra Hubby (born November 23, 1978) is an American model and the March 2004 Playmate of the Month in Playboy magazine. Hubby was born and raised in Ohio, just outside Columbus. She worked on a farm. She is a former contestant in the Miss Hawaiian Tropic pageant representing Columbus. She heard that Playboy was casting models while listening to the radio and went to Cleveland to try out. Hubby appeared in the 2005 Playmates at Play at the Playboy Mansion swimsuit calendar as the April calendar girl.

April

Krista Kelly (born June 18, 1977) is a Canadian model. She is Playboy's Playmate of the Month for April 2004.

May

Nicole Whitehead (born November 5, 1980, in Birmingham, Alabama) is an American model. She is Playboy's Playmate of the Month for May 2004. Prior to that, she was Cyber Girl of the Week for January 28, 2002, and then Cyber Girl of the Month for May 2002.

June

 is a Japanese model, in June 2004 she became the second Japanese to be featured as a Playboy Playmate of the month.

Oshima lives in Los Angeles, where she now works as a professional photo stylist and actively pursues her passion for dance as a Playmate Dancer. "I never dance sexy when I go out, but on stage, it's liberating", she once explained. "In fact, I feel much sexier when I’m performing with the Playmate Dancers."

July

Stephanie Glasson is an American model. She is the Playboy Playmate of the Month for July 2004. Married former NHL goalie Curtis Joseph in 2012.

August

Pilar Lastra (born January 15, 1981) is a model and the Playboy Playmate of the Month for August 2004. She also hosted "The Playmate Hour" on Playboy Radio. Lastra was a model on Deal or No Deal.

September

Scarlett Keegan (born May 18, 1984, in Westlake Village, California) is an American model and Playboy's Playmate of the Month for September 2004.

Scarlett Keegan's mom was born in Ireland and lived there until the age of 15. Keegan takes the time to visit Ireland annually with her husband who is also of Irish descent. "I visit Dublin at least once a year, and I’m happy to say that I have spent at least one St. Patrick's Day in the city", she told the website Playmates.com. "It's a bank holiday there, so the streets were completely packed. My favorite part was the huge parade that takes place in the city center."

After Playboy, Keegan pursued an acting career in the mid- and late 2000s, including a small part in Walk Hard: The Dewey Cox Story. As of 2019, Keegan lives in southern California with her husband and two children.

October

Kimberly Holland (born August 1, 1982) is an American model and Playmate of the Month for October 2004. Gorgeous, buxom, and voluptuous blonde bombshell Kimberly Ann Holland was born on August 1, 1982, in Humble, Texas. Kimberly graduated from Humble High School in 2000. She tried out for "Playboy" for the 50th Anniversary Playmate Hunt. After making her debut in a pictorial in the December, 2003 issue of "Playboy", Holland was chosen to be the Playmate of the Month for the October, 2004 issue of the famous men's magazine. She has appeared in a couple of "Playboy" videos. Moreover, Kimberly was the "Playboy" Cyber Girl of the Week for the fourth week of January, 2004 and the Cyber Girl of the Month for May, 2004. That same year Holland also graduated from the University of Houston with a degree in marketing. In 2010 she graduated with a degree in nursing from the University of Miami. As of 2019, Holland is living in Florida and has one son.

November

Cara Zavaleta (born June 15, 1980, in Bowling Green, Ohio) is an American model and reality TV personality. She is the Playboy Playmate of the Month for November 2004.

Cara Zavaleta is a wine enthusiast who would like to eventually become an independent winemaker. "I must make wine", she has said. "There's just one problem: I’m equally obsessed with Southern California, which isn’t exactly Napa Valley in terms of wine production. The good news is that a few different Malibu-based vineyards produce great wine. So who knows? Maybe I’ll combine my two passions—wine and Southern California—and become the next big Malibu winemaker."

December

Tiffany Fallon (born May 1, 1974, in Ft. Lauderdale, Florida) is an American model and is Playboy's Playmate of the Month for December. She is also the 2005 Playmate of the Year. She married country singer Joe Don Rooney; the couple has two children.

See also
 List of people in Playboy 2000–2009

References

2004-related lists
2004
Playmates Of 2004